The men's handball tournament at the 1996 Summer Olympics was contested by twelve teams divided in two groups, with the top two proceeding to the semifinals and the bottom four proceeding to placement matches.

Qualification

Squads

Preliminary round

Group A

Group B

Final round

Bracket

Eleventh place game

Ninth place game

Seventh place game

Fifth place game

Semifinals

Bronze medal game

Final

Rankings and statistics

References

External links
Handball & Olympic Games 1936-2000, International Handball Federation, pp. 35–37
Atlanta 1996: Handball at marcolympics.org

Handball at the 1996 Summer Olympics
Men's events at the 1996 Summer Olympics